Davarzan (also Romanized as Dāvarzan; also known as Duvarzān) is a city and capital of Davarzan County, Razavi Khorasan Province, Iran. At the 2006 census, its population was 2,387, in 705 families.

References 

Populated places in Davarzan County
Cities in Razavi Khorasan Province